San Pietro a Patierno is a suburb of Naples, the chief city in Campania, Italy.

Geography
It is one of the largest suburbs of Naples and is relatively lightly populated compared to surrounding areas, with around 20,000 residents. The district of Capodichino includes Naples International Airport, the Ugo Niutta military airport, and the US Naval Support Activity where the United States Sixth Fleet has its home base.

History
Historically, the area was a feudal holding under the Angevin rule of Naples in the Middle Ages and called by its Latin name, Sanctus Petrus ad Peternum. It was abolished as a fief by Murat in the early 19th century and finally incorporated into the city of Naples during the Fascist period.

Notes and references

Quartieri of Naples
Former municipalities of the Province of Naples